To My Queen is an album led by vibraphonist and composer Walt Dickerson recorded in 1962 and released on the New Jazz label.

Reception

The Allmusic reviewer stated: "The whole album is swathed in a gauzy glow that speaks even more eloquently than its creator's conceptual ambition; this is music from the heart as well as the mind". Down Beat reviewer Don Nelson wrote: "This tribute from Dickerson to his wife constitutes some of the finest jazz I have heard this year. It is necessary listening not only to those interested in the forward march of Walt Dickerson, but to those interested in the forward march of jazz".

Track listing 
 "To My Queen" (Walt Dickerson) - 17:32
 "How Deep Is the Ocean?" (Irving Berlin) - 11:05
 "God Bless the Child" (Billie Holiday, Arthur Herzog, Jr.) - 3:54

Personnel 
Walt Dickerson - vibraphone
Andrew Hill – piano
George Tucker – bass
Andrew Cyrille – drums

References 

Walt Dickerson albums
1962 albums
Albums produced by Esmond Edwards
Albums recorded at Van Gelder Studio
New Jazz Records albums